David Lajoux (born 3 July 1966) is a Monegasque alpine skier. He competed in two events at the 1984 Winter Olympics.

References

1966 births
Living people
Monegasque male alpine skiers
Olympic alpine skiers of Monaco
Alpine skiers at the 1984 Winter Olympics
Place of birth missing (living people)